Collier Schorr (born 1963) is an American artist and fashion photographer best known for adolescent portraits that blend photographic realism with elements of fiction and youthful fantasy.

Schorr grew up in Queens, New York and studied journalism at the School of Visual Arts. In the 1980s and 1990s she also worked actively as an art critic. Her photography work was featured in the 2002 Whitney Biennial and the 2003 International Center for Photography Triennial. In 2008 she received a Berlin Prize by the American Academy in Berlin. Collier Schorr is represented by Stuart Shave/Modern Art, London and 303 Gallery, New York. She currently resides in Brooklyn and spends her summers with family in Schwäbisch Gmünd, in Southern Germany.

Her work explores a multitude of themes, including history, nationality, and war, with an emphasis on identity and gender. Her influences include Barbara Kruger, Cindy Sherman, and Laurie Simmons, along with German and Jewish social history, World War II, wrestling, painter Andrew Wyeth, and German photographer August Sander.

Early work 
From the beginning of her photography career in 1986 to about 2014, Schorr's work was primarily seen in a number of solo exhibitions, along with published books to aid in further exploration of various overarching themes.

By incorporating documentary, fantasy, and an occasional interweaving of different media, Schorr dissected the concepts behind identity politics in an age of feminism. She was heavily influenced by the androgyny of 1980s fashion, and utilized the momentum it generated to create art that drew upon elements of fashion photography while also interrogating other cultural boundaries. Though her recent work is featured in fashion magazines, her earlier photographs would easily fit there as well.

There I Was, a gallery show at the 303 Gallery in New York and book released in 2009, is a perfect example of Schorr's abilities to push the limits of medium and perspective. Drawing on her experience with the drag car racer Charlie Snyder and his surprising death in Vietnam, Schorr questions everything regarding reportage, memory, and the inability to recreate the past. She combines drawings, photos, and cut-up magazines to create a collage of information that conveys her thoughts about the disconnect between the photograph, the viewer, and the subject.

Ultimately, Schorr's early work represents her exploration of feminism, identity, sexuality, and gender during a period wherein these concepts were being questioned on a larger cultural scale. Through her personal touches and combination of media, Schorr exalts the underrepresented to find her own place in society.

Recent work 
Although Schorr continues her exploration of adolescent androgyny, her photographic platform fully transitioned to fashion magazines by 2014. Her earliest fashion photography was featured in such publications as Purple Magazine and i-D, and focused on clothing rather than on artistic photography.  Her later photography would combine the two by utilizing popular culture icons. She recently photographed newly famous adolescent actors Finn Wolfhard and Millie Bobby Brown for Dazed magazine, highlighting their physical similarities.  Other pop culture icons Schorr has worked with include Timothée Chalamet, Janelle Monáe, and Jodie Foster, and further explores androgyny and removes the subject from stereotypical depictions of gender.

Schorr's work expresses a viewpoint that is neither masculine nor heterosexual. Much of her work comes from a place of altering perception, either looking deeper into what is considered normal or altering the usual context of an idea in order to create a commentary on the subject.

In 2019, Collier Schorr received the Royal Photographic Society Award for Editorial, Advertising, and Fashion Photography, with an Honorary Fellowship of the Society.

Notable works

Jens F. 
First exhibited at the 2002 Whitney Biennial, and then featured at the 303 Gallery in New York in 2003, Jens F. features a myriad of photographs, sketches, and notes regarding the image of a young German boy. Using Andrew Wyeth's depictions of the model Helga from the late 20th century as a template, Schorr depicts male Jens as an androgynous and emotional figure. The obvious juxtaposition of genders and the boy's acknowledging gaze conveys the idea that modern sexuality is being challenged with confidence.

Forests and Fields 
After living in the small town of Schwabisch Gmund, Germany for 12 years, Schorr has created Forests and Fields in order to explore the composition of the environment, its inhabitants, and herself. The collection was first presented as a complete exhibition at the 303 Gallery in 2001, focusing on images that varied from young boys dressed in Nazi uniforms to deliberately designed still-lifes of nature. In a nod toward August Sander's 1930s work, Schorr later expanded the project into multiple books, each focusing on a different aspect of her overall idea.

Volume 1: Neighbors 
Neighbors was published in 2006 as the first volume of Forests and Fields, and mainly focuses on ambiguous portraits. Schorr manipulates themes of nationality, identity, and history to create a scrapbook-like composition of images that toes the line between documentary and fantasy. An exhibition titled Badischer Kunstverein took place in 2007 to accompany this volume.

Volume 2: Blumen 
Moving away from portraits, Blumen focuses on the German landscape. By manipulating small aspects about everyday natural objects, Schorr comments further on the relationships between the German town and the citizens themselves, all while adding in overtones of fantasy.

Wrestlers 
In 2002, Schorr visited Blairstown, New Jersey, and West Point, New York to photograph their wrestling teams in action. Her goal in capturing these images of vulnerability, struggle, and the pain was to reveal the undiscovered duality of wrestling. While being an undeniably masculine sport, it possesses romantic and feminine elements that push it into the realm of androgyny and gender fluidity. Schorr hopes to compile the photos into an art book titled Wrestlers Love America in the future.

8 Women 
8 Women was exhibited at the 303 Gallery in 2014, consisting of 14 works of eight women accumulated over the past twenty years. With a combination of headshots, full-body nudes, action poses, and a drawing, Schorr conveys a sense of feminine power that neither objectifies the subjects nor dates the photos. By consistently incorporating elements of fashion photography, Schorr is able to comment on how representation and hyper-sexualization functions in both fashion and feminist culture today.

Publications 
 Jens f.  Göttingen: Steidl Mack; London: Thames & Hudson, 2005.. A compilation of photographs of a young boy developing into a man through poses similar to those of Andrew Wyeth's painted Helga.
 Neighbors = Nachbarn. Schorr. Göttingen: Steidl Mack, 2006. . A historical and fictional story told through photographs about a small town in Germany where apparitions reside. She pieces together a tale of her own family tree through "memory, nationalism, war, emigration, and family".
 Male: From the collection of Vince Aletti. Schorr. New York: PPP, 2008. . Photography critic/curator Vince Aletti's amassed collection of work of male bodies with an essay from Schorr, describing how these pieces have influenced her own work and the acceptance of gay men into art history.
 There I was. Schorr. Göttingen: Steidl, 2008. . Using her father's and Charlie Astoria Chas Snyder's photos, her own sketches, and vintage car ads, Collier weaves together a story of the young drag racer's death in Vietnam and the complexity of a photograph's perspective.
 Blumen. Schorr. Göttingen: Steidl Mack, 2010 . A second addition to her previous book about the small town in Germany, Neighbors. This focuses less on figures and more on the natural landscape of the village that Schorr has inhabited for the past 13 years.
 8 Women. Schorr. London: Mack, 2014. . A collection of her work from the mid-nineties to 2014, focusing on the female's perspective of women "who want to be looked at", like models, musicians, and artists.
 Collier Schorr: I Blame Jordan. Long Island City, NY: MoMA PS1, 2015. . A compilation of photographs taken of model Jordan Barrett for the MoMA PS1.
August. London: Mack, 2022. .

Solo exhibitions 
The Chase, 303 Gallery, New York, NY, 1990
303 Gallery, New York, NY, 1991
303 Gallery, New York, NY, 1993
303 Gallery, New York, NY, 1994
303 Gallery, New York, NY, 1997
303 Gallery, New York, NY, 1999
Emily Tsingou Gallery, London, 2000
303 Gallery, New York, NY, 2001
303 Gallery, New York, NY, 2004
Forests & Fields, Karlsruhe, Germany, 2007
There I Was, 303 Gallery, New York, NY, 2007
Jens F, Museum of Contemporary Art Denver, CO, USA, 2008
There I Was, Le Consortium, Dijon, France, 2008
Blumen, Villa Romana Prize, Florence, Italy, 2008
German Faces, Berardo Collection (as part of PHotoEspaña), Lisbon, Portugal, 2010
Journals & Notebooks, 303 Gallery, New York, NY, 2010
8 Women, 303 Gallery, New York, NY, 2018

Collections
 Burger Collection, Hong Kong, China
 Fondazione Sandretto Re Rebaudengo, Turin, Italy
 Hammer Museum, Los Angeles, CA, USA
 Henry Art Gallery, Seattle, WA, USA
 The Jewish Museum, New York, NY
 The Museum of Modern Art, New York, NY
 North Carolina Museum of Art, Raleigh, NC, USA
 Rubell Family Collection, Miami, FL, USA
 San Francisco Museum of Modern Art, San Francisco, CA, USA
 Wadsworth Atheneum Museum of Art, Hartford, CT, USA
 Walker Art Center, Minneapolis, MN, USA
 Whitney Museum of American Art, New York

References

External links
 
 
 Collier Schorr at 303 Gallery
 Collier Schorr on ArtForum
 Interview with Schorr
 Collier Schorr on Yale University School of Art website

1963 births
Living people
American photographers
Artists from New York City
American lesbian artists
Jewish American artists
LGBT Jews
School of Visual Arts alumni
People from Queens, New York
American women photographers
21st-century American Jews
21st-century American LGBT people
21st-century American women artists
Vanity Fair (magazine) people